Harold Jacob Bruder (born August 31, 1930) is an American realist painter. In 1984, he was honored with a National Endowment for the Arts Fellowship. He is a former professor of art, working with the Kansas City Art Institute, Pratt Institute, National Academy of Design, Aspen Art Museum, and Queens College of the City University of New York (CUNY). He served as the Chairman of the Art Department at CUNY, where he taught painting and drawing for 30 years, retiring in 1995, as Professor Emeritus.

Personal background 
Bruder was born in 1930 in Bronx, New York. He studied at High School of Music and Art and Cooper Union School of Art in New York City. He studied singing privately during this period and those experiences later influenced his writings and lectures on early opera singers. He graduated from Cooper Union in 1951.

Professional background 
After graduating from college, Bruder worked as a graphic designer and art director in Manhattan for 12 years, while painting privately and occasionally exhibiting. During this time, he studied printmaking at the Pratt Graphic Art Center.

In 1962, Bruder's first one-person show of genre paintings, derived from family photographs at the Robert Isaacson Gallery drew considerable attention in the press and art magazines. In 1963, his work was included in the Corcoran Gallery of Art biennial art exhibition in Washington, D.C., and the Pennsylvania Academy of the Fine Arts annual art exhibition in Philadelphia.

In 1963, Bruder moved to Kansas City, Missouri with his family, and became Chairman of the Graphic Design Department at the Kansas City Art Institute. He taught painting the second year and exhibited at the Art Institute in 1964, as well as the prestigious Durlacher Bros. Gallery (owned by Robert Isaacson) in New York City.

In 1965, Bruder returned to New York from Kansas City. He subsequently joined the faculty of the Fashion Institute of Technology, Pratt Institute, and Queens College of the City University of New York, teaching in the art departments. While he left the Fashion Institute and Pratt Institute after one year, he continued working with CUNY for over 30 years.

In the summer of 1967, Bruder taught at the Aspen School of Contemporary Art in Aspen, Colorado.

Bruder's work was featured in numerous exhibits over the next few years that focused on "New Realism". In 1970, he was one of the original group of realist painters in the Whitney Museum of American Art's "22 Realists", along with Chuck Close, Audrey Flack, and Philip Pearlstein.

In the late 1970s, he began "The Vault Series", a group of six large paintings of draperies stretched across a wall that were exhibited at the Queens Museum of Art in 1982, and later at the Armstrong Gallery in New York in 1984. The reviews commented on Bruder's concern with renaissance-like tactility, air, and light, comparing Bruder with Titian and Michelangelo.

Over the next decade, Bruder continued exhibiting regularly at Durlacher Bros., Armstrong Gallery, and Forum Gallery, as well as in numerous museum and gallery group exhibitions throughout the United States.

In 1965, he returned to New York from Kansas City. He joined the faculty of Queens College of the City University of New York (CUNY). He taught painting and drawing there for 30 years, serving as Chairman of the Art Department in the early 1980s, retiring in 1995, as Professor Emeritus.

After retirement from CUNY, Bruder briefly joined the staff at the National Academy of Design in New York City.

Public collections 
In 2004, a mini-retrospective covering 40 years of Bruder's work was held at the Mitchell Algus Gallery in New York. Public collections include the following.

 Hirshhorn Museum of the Smithsonian, Washington, D.C.
 University of New Mexico Art Museum
 Sheldon Museum of Art of the University of Nebraska
 New Jersey State Museum
 Montclair Art Museum, Montclair, New Jersey
 Goddard Art Center, Ardmore, Oklahoma
 Palm Springs Desert Museum
 Albert List Foundation

Art exhibitions 
Solo exhibitions
 1962: Robert Isaacson Gallery, New York City
 1964: Kansas City Art Institute, Kansas City, Missouri
 1964: Durlacher Bros., New York City
 1967: Durlacher Bros., New York City
 1968: Forum Gallery, New York City
 1969: Owen Gallery, Denver, Colorado
 1969: Forum Gallery, New York City
 1972: Forum Gallery, New York City
 1976: Forum Gallery, New York City
 1979: William & Mary College, Williamsburg, Virginia
 1979: Forum Gallery, New York City
 1982: "The Vault Series" Queens Museum of Art, Flushing, New York
 1984: "The Vault Series" Armstrong Gallery, New York City
 1986: Armstrong Gallery, New York City
 1988: Contemporary Realist Gallery, San Francisco, California
 2004: "Selected Paintings 1963-2003" Mitchell Algus Gallery, New York City
 2005: "Time & the Tabletop" Queens College Art Center, Flushing, New York

Group exhibitions
 1963: "Pennsylvania Academy Annual"
 1963: "9 Realist Painters" Robert Schoelkopf Gallery, New York City
 1963: "Corcoran Biennial" Corcoran Gallery of Art, Washington, D.C.
 1964: "Modern Realism & Surrealism" American Federation of Arts
 1965: "Contemporaries 1" Gallery of Modern Art, New York City
 1965: "The Painter & the Photograph" University of New Mexico
 1967: "Environment" Terry Dintenfass Gallery, New York City
 1970: "22 Realists" Whitney Museum of American Art, New York City
 1970: "Paintings From the Photo" Riverside Museum, New York City
 1970: "New-Realism" St. Cloud State College, St. Cloud, Minnesota
 1972: "Painters of Land & Sky", Colgate University
 1973: "A Sense of Place" University of Nebraska
 1973: "The Realist Revival" New York City Cultural Center
 1973: "American Realist Painting" Espace Cardi, Paris, France
 1974: "Aspects of the Figure" Cleveland Museum of Art
 1974: "Living American Artists & The Figure" University of Pennsylvania
 1974: "The Figure in Recent American Painting" Westminster College
 1975: "Candid Painting" DeCordoba Museum, Boston, Massachusetts
 1975: "Portrait Painting" Allan Frumkin Gallery, New York City
 1976: "American Art Today" University of Virginia Museum of Art
 1976: "This Land is My Land" New Jersey State Museum, Trenton, New Jersey
 1976: "American Family Portraits" Philadelphia Museum of Art
 1976: "Liturgical Arts" The Civic Center, Philadelphia, Pennsylvania
 1976: "Urban Aesthetics" Queens Museum of Art, Flushing, New York
 1978: American Academy of Arts & Letters, New York City
 1979: "Things Seen" University of Nebraska
 1983: "Painting New York" Museum of the City of New York, New York City
 1983: "The Figure Observed" University of Florida, Gainesville, Florida
 1984: "9 Realist Painters Revisited" Robert Schoelkopf Gallery, New York City
 1985: "Survival of the Fittest" Ingber Gallery, New York City
 1985: Art Institute of Boston, Boston, Massachusetts
 1985: Minneapolis College of Art, Minneapolis, Minnesota
 1986: "Movietone Muse" One Penn Plaza, New York City
 1987: "Visions of America" ACA Gallery, New York City
 1987: "American Art Today" Florida International University, Miami, Florida
 1988: "Triumph of Virtue" National Academy of Design, New York City
 1989: Columbus Museum of Art, Columbus, Ohio
 1989: "University & the Arts" Wayne State University, Detroit, Michigan
 1990: "Objects Observed" Gallery Henoch, New York City
 1992: Lillian Heidenberg Gallery, New York City
 1996: National Academy of Design, New York City
 1996: Gremillion & Co., Houston, Texas
 2002: "Summer Exhibit" Walter Wickiser Gallery, New York City
 2008: "Five Views to the Landscape" Riverrun Gallery, Lambertville, New Jersey
 2008: "An Exhibition of East Coast Landscapes" Fieldstone Gallery, Ramsey, New Jersey

Honors and awards 
 1974: CUNY Faculty Research Award
 1979: American Academy of Arts & Letters Award
 1979: CUNY Faculty Research Award
 1984: CUNY Faculty Research Award
 1985: National Endowment for the Arts: Visual Arts Fellowship
 1987: Queens College Faculty-in-Residence Award
 1988: CUNY Faculty Research Award

References 

Who's Who in American Art 2011
Who's Who in America 2011

External links 
 

1930 births
Living people
20th-century American painters
American male painters
21st-century American painters
American realist painters
The High School of Music & Art alumni
20th-century American male artists